Changes is the first studio album by German recording artist Roman Lob, released by Universal Music Domestic Pop on April 13, 2012, in German-speaking Europe. Recorded after Lob's win of the national pre-selection programme for the Eurovision Song Contest 2012, Unser Star für Baku, under the guidance of musician Thomas D.

Singles
 "Standing Still" was released as the lead single from the album on February 16, 2012. On May 26, 2012, he sang the song at the Eurovision Song Contest for Germany. The song achieved eighth place with 110 points.
 "Call Out the Sun" was released as the second single from the album on August 31, 2012.

Track listing

Charts

References

External links
 RomanLob.de – official site

2012 albums
Roman Lob albums